The Columbus Landsharks were a member of the National Lacrosse League from 2001 until 2003. They were based in Columbus, Ohio. After the 2003 season, the franchise moved to Phoenix, Arizona, becoming the Arizona Sting. This move was based on poor attendance.

Awards & honors

All time record

2000-01 season

2001-02 season

2002-03 schedule

Notes

Sports teams in Columbus, Ohio
Defunct National Lacrosse League teams
Lacrosse clubs established in 2001
Lacrosse clubs disestablished in 2003
2001 establishments in Ohio
2003 disestablishments in Ohio
Lacrosse teams in Ohio